Fowell is a surname. Notable people with the surname include:

Edmund Fowell (1598–1664), English politician
Sir Edmund Fowell, 1st Baronet
John Fowell (disambiguation), multiple people
Joseph Fowell, Australian architect
Fowell baronets